The Cathedral of the Annunciation of the Virgin, also called Greek Catholic Melkite Cathedral of the Annunciation of the Virgin or simply Church of Our Lady of the Annunciation, is a Melkite Greek Catholic cathedral located in the Christian Quarter of the Old City of Jerusalem. It is dedicated to the Annunciation.

It serves as the headquarters of the Melkite Greek Catholic Patriarchal Dependent Territory of Jerusalem (Archieparchia Hierosolymitana Melchitarum), whose patriarch since 1772 is responsible for the Jerusalem Melkites by the encyclical Orientalium dignitas of Pope Leo XIII.

As part of the Old City of Jerusalem, it is categorised as a UNESCO World Heritage site since 1981.

See also

 Catholic Church in the Palestinian territories
 Melkite Greek Catholic Church

References

External links
Greek Melkite Catholic Patriarchate Guesthouse, Jerusalem

Cathedrals in Jerusalem
Eastern Catholic cathedrals in Israel
Eastern Catholic cathedrals in the State of Palestine
Eastern Catholic church buildings in Jerusalem
Melkite Greek Catholic churches in Israel
Melkite Greek Catholic church buildings in the State of Palestine
Christian Quarter